This is a list of all cricketers who have played first-class, List A or Twenty20 cricket for Boland cricket team in South Africa. Seasons given are first and last seasons; the player did not necessarily play in all the intervening seasons.

A

 Craig Abrahams, 2006/07
 Shaakir Abrahams, 2018/19
 Ziyaad Abrahams, 2016/17–2019/20
 Warwick Abrahim, 2017/18–2019/20
 Zahir Abrahim, 1997/98–2006/07
 Sean Ackermann, 1996/97–1998/99
 Brendon Adams, 2001/02–2008/09
 Ferisco Adams, 2011/12–2019/20
 James Albanie, 1995/96–1999/00
 Wallace Albertyn, 1997/98–2006/07
 Craig Alexander, 2019/20
 Pravin Amre, 1999/00
 Iain Anderson, 1983/84
 Sean Andrews, 1991/92–1993/94
 Pienaar Anker, 1981/82–1990/91
 Rayno Arendse, 1997/98–2009/10
 Clayton August, 2003/04–2009/10

B

 Bryan Baguley, 1995/96–1997/98
 Rupert Bailey, 1998/99–2005/06
 Eddie Barlow, 1981/82–1982/83
 Hendrik Barnard, 1989/90–1993/94
 Jacobus Barnard, 1989/90–1990/91
 Pieter Barnard, 2000/01
 Solomon Barnard, 1979/80–1983/84
 Kim Barnett, 1982/83–1987/88
 Simon Base, 1987/88–1988/89
 Hendrik Basson, 1979/80–1987/88
 Raymond Bath, 1979/80–1980/81
 Chad Baxter, 2002/03–2003/04
 David Bedingham, 2015/16–2018/19
 Howard Bergins, 1981/82–1986/87
 Wayne Bird, 1991/92–1992/93
 Uwe-Karl Birkenstock, 2009/10–2014/15
 Henco Bornmann, 2011/12
 Tennyson Botes, 2006/07
 Dewald Botha, 2003/04–2015/16
 Gabriel Botha, 1990/91
 Niel Botha, 2007/08–2017/18
 Schoeman Botha, 1988/89
 Johannes Bothma, 2001/02–2009/10
 Mark Bredell, 1994/95
 Jean Bredenkamp, 2008/09–2016/17
 Kevin Bridgens, 1988/89–1992/93
 Matt Brink, 1992/93–1997/98
 Robert Brown, 1986/87–1989/90
 Jaco Burger, 1992/93

C

 Ian Callen, 1985/86
 Dale Campbell, 2005/06–2007/08
 Mike Cann, 1993/94
 Ryan Canning, 2012/13–2013/14
 Neil Carter, 1998/99–2003/04
 Junaid Cassiem, 2008/09–2017/18
 Barry Chedburn, 1991/92–1994/95
 Daniel Childs, 2006/07–2011/12
 Jonathan Clark, 2003/04–2004/05
 Achille Cloete, 2014/15–2019/20
 Tiaan Cloete, 2004/05–2014/15
 Charl Coetzee, 1979/80–1985/86
 John Commins, 1993/94–1994/95
 Murray Commins, 2017/18–2018/19
 Kevin Curran, 1994/95–1997/98
 Andrew Cyster, 2000/01–2003/04
 Charl Cyster, 2016/17–2019/20
 Reeve Cyster, 2011/12–2019/20

D

 Robert Dalrymple, 1992/93–1994/95
 Pieter Daneel, 2000/01–2006/07
 Dominic Daniels, 2009/10–2010/11
 Siphamandla Dapo, 2016/17
 Faiek Davids, 1993/94
 Henry Davids, 1998/99–2009/10
 Fritz de Beer, 2017/18–2019/20
 Phillip DeFreitas, 1993/94–1995/96
 Manfred de Kock, 1999/00–2000/01
 Andre de Lange, 2008/09
 Con de Lange, 1993/94–2006/07
 Abraham de Swardt, 1988/89–1989/90
 Colin Dettmer, 1991/92–1993/94
 Jacques de Villiers, 1979/80–1981/82
 John de Villiers, 1989/90–1992/93
 Morne de Vries, 2002/03–2010/11
 Hennie de Wet, 2007/08–2009/10 
 Justin Dill, 2007/08–2016/17
 Sifundo Dimaza, 2013/14
 Ockert Douglas, 1987/88–1989/90
 Bryan Drew, 1992/93–1998/99
 Andre du Toit, 1979/80–1986/87
 Jacobus du Toit, 1986/87–1989/90
 Willem du Toit, 1997/98–2008/09

E

 Grant Edmeades, 2014/15–2015/16
 Allan Elgar, 1992/93–1993/94
 Rabian Engelbrecht, 2005/06–2012/13
 Cedric English, 1998/99–1999/00
 Marais Erasmus, 1988/89–1996/97
 Ockert Erasmus, 2006/07–2014/15
 Wesley Euley, 2003/04–2004/05

F

 Evert Ferreira, 1996/97–1998/99
 Lloyd Ferreira, 1993/94–1996/97
 Lambert Fick, 1982/83–1983/84
 Winston Fortuin, 1993/94–1997/98
 Henri Fourie, 2003/04–2005/06
 Faan Fourie, 2010/11
 Bardo Fransman, 2003/04–2006/07
 Matthew Friedlander, 2001/02–2003/04
 Jan Frylinck, 2008/09–2012/13

G

 Isma-eel Gafieldien, 2014/15–2019/20
 Douglas Gain, 1998/99–1999/00
 Dayyaan Galiem, 2018/19
 Francois Geldenhuys, 2005/06
 Gereldo George, 2015/16
 L Germishuys, 1993/94
 Louis-Marc Germishuys, 1993/94–1996/97
 Brandon Glover, 2016/17–2018/19
 Sinalo Gobeni, 2016/17–2019/20
 Chad Grainger, 1997/98–1998/99
 Stephanus Grobler, 2006/07–2008/09
 Ryan Groeneveld, 2002/03–2006/07
 Warren Groeneveld, 2007/08–2011/12

H

 Warren Hayward, 2001/02–2008/09
 Philip Hearle, 1997/98
 Benjamin Hector, 1999/00–2007/08
 Claude Henderson, 1990/91–1997/98
 James Henderson, 1992/93–2001/02
 Tyron Henderson, 2007/08
 Darryl Hendricks, 2014/15–2018/19
 John Hendricks, 1979/80–1988/89
 Charles Hendrikse, 1980/81–1982/83
 Erasmus Hendrikse, 2003/04
 Omar Henry, 1984/85–1993/94
 Riyaad Henry, 2005/06–2015/16
 Cecil Heydenrych, 1987/88–1990/91
 George Hlazo, 2014/15
 Lloyd Hobson, 2007/08
 Denys Hobson, 2002/03–2005/06
 Stuart Hockly, 1994/95
 Rohan Hoffman, 1993/94–1994/95
 Adrian Holdstock, 1993/94–1995/96

I
 Alan Igglesden, 1992/93

J

 Kenny Jackson, 1993/94–2001/02
 Lawton Jacobs, 1983/84–1988/89
 Roelof Jacobs, 2007/08
 Rushdi Jappie, 2012/13–2013/14
 Stephen Jefferies, 1993/94
 Petrus Jeftha, 2002/03–2015/16
 Stephen Jones, 1981/82–1987/88
 Henno Jordaan, 2008/09–2011/12
 Hendrik Joubert, 1984/85–1985/86
 Johannes Justus, 1984/85–1990/91

K

 Vinod Kambli, 2002/03
 Quinton Kannemeyer, 2002/03–2010/11
 Thomas Kannemeyer, 2013/14–2019/20
 Eldred Kasner, 1979/80–1980/81
 Jerry Kennedy, 1958/59–1980/81
 Leslie Kets, 1982/83–1985/86
 Simon Khomari, 2015/16–2019/20
 Donovan Koch, 1998/99–2001/02
 Louis Koen, 1990/91–2001/02
 Pieter Koen, 1990/91–1991/92
 Derek Kohler, 1984/85
 Hanno Kotze, 2009/10–2019/20
 Manrich Kotze, 2008/09–2010/11
 Emile Kriek, 2006/07–2015/16
 Ian Kuiler, 1995/96–1996/97
 Adrian Kuiper, 1995/96–1997/98

L

 Marius La Grange, 1986/87–1987/88
 Peter Laing, 2005/06–2007/08
 Nicolaas Lambrechts, 1982/83–1990/91
 Charl Langeveldt, 1997/98–2013/14
 W Laubscher, 1979/80–1980/81
 Terence Lazard, 1993/94–1995/96
 Leon le Roux, 2009/10–2012/13
 Darryl le Roux, 1984/85
 L le Roux, 1982/83
 Elmar Liebenberg, 1995/96–1996/97
 Ernest Looch, 1998/99
 Zaheer Lorgat, 2012/13–2014/15
 Conrad Lotz, 2007/08
 Matthys Lotz, 1989/90–1990/91
 Michael Loubser, 2011/12–2015/16
 Curtley Louw, 2008/09–2018/19
 Johann Louw, 2010/11–2013/14
 Willem Louw, 2003/04–2005/06
 Craig Lowe, 1989/90–1990/91

M

 Jonathan Mackey, 1997/98
 Rashaad Magiet, 2003/04
 Monde Mahlombe, 2013/14–2014/15
 Daniel Malan, 1979/80–1981/82
 Dawid Malan, 2000/01–2005/06
 Pieter Malan, 2017/18–2018/19
 Craig Marais, 1993/94–1994/95
 Graeme Marais, 2001/02–2003/04
 Jean Marais, 2014/15–2015/16
 Rico Marais, 1988/89–1990/91
 Sinegugu Maseko, 2015/16–2016/17
 Thando Mdodana, 2012/13
 Fenito Mehl, 2010/11–2019/20
 Carl Mellors, 1988/89–1989/90
 David Millns, 1996/97
 Phumza Mntungwa, 2014/15–2017/18
 Francois Moolman, 1979/80-1980/81
 Tshepo Moreki, 2015/16
 Mangaliso Mtiya, 2016/17
 Zurich Muller, 1995/96
 James Munnik, 1984/85–1987/88
 Jodi Myers, 1994/95–2000/01

N

 Imran Nackerdien, 2003/04–2013/14
 Salieg Nackerdien, 1983/84–1995/96
 Anwell Newman, 1992/93–1997/98
 Phil Newport, 1987/88
 Karl Nieuwoudt, 2003/04–2010/11
 Nicholas Northcote, 2005/06

O

 André Odendaal, 1980/81–1981/82
 Aidan Olivier, 2005/06–2007/08
 Mario Olivier, 2004/05
 Justin Ontong, 1992/93–2017/18
 Riaan Oosthuizen, 1991/92–1996/97

P

 Steve Palframan, 1997/98–2002/03
 Gordon Parsons, 1983/84–1984/85
 Hillroy Paulse, 2003/04–2015/16
 Trevor Penney, 1991/92
 Keegan Petersen, 2009/10–2016/17
 Robin Peterson, 2015/16
 Sean Phillips, 2003/04–2004/05
 Danico Philmon, 2012/13–2018/19
 Marc Pina, 1987/88–1990/91
 Bradley Player, 1999/00–2000/01
 Soyisile Pono, 2014/15–2016/17
 Anthonie Potgieter, 1979/80–1980/81
 Johannes Pretorius, 1983/84
 Andrew Pringle, 2000/01–2001/02
 Clifford Prinsloo, 2004/05–2006/07

Q
 Zakhele Qwabe, 2013/14–2017/18

R

 Wayne Radford, 1988/89
 Omphile Ramela, 2007/08–2011/12
 Carl Raubenheimer, 2009/10–2013/14
 Barry Richards, 1992/93–1993/94
 Ian Richards, 1987/88–1989/90
 Leon Roberts, 1979/80–1984/85
 John Roos, 1987/88–1994/95
 David Rushmere, 2019/20

S

 Mark Sanders, 2003/04
 Pepler Sandri, 1996/97–2008/09
 Kobus Scholtz, 2017/18–2019/20
 Richard Schultz, 1979/80–1981/82
 Waylain September, 2001/02–2008/09
 Nkululeko Serame, 2017/18–2019/20
 Letlotlo Sesele, 2012/13–2013/14
 Kyle Simmonds, 2016/17–2018/19
 Daniel Sincuba, 2018/19–2019/20
 Martinus Smit, 1983/84–1985/86
 Willem Smit, 1992/93–2006/07
 Deon Smith, 1990/91–1993/94
 Richard Smith, 1992/93–1995/96
 Neil Snyman, 1989/90–1992/93
 Carl Spilhaus, 1985/86–1987/88
 Billy Stelling, 1994/95–1996/97
 John Stephenson, 1988/89
 Godfrey Stevens, 2001/02–2016/17
 Gerhard Strydom, 1994/95–2007/08
 Shane Summers, 2005/06–2006/07
 Warren Swan, 2003/04–2006/07
 Josua Swanepoel, 2001/02–2006/07
 Peter Swart, 1981/82–1982/83
 Pieter Swart, 1994/95
 Leighton Swarts, 2016/17

T

 Jacob Taljaard, 1986/87–1987/88
 Roger Telemachus, 1993/94–1997/98
 Ruan Terblanche, 2008/09–2019/20
 Gary Thomas, 1987/88
 Detlev Traut, 1979/80–1984/85
 Jonathan Trott, 1999/00–2000/01
 Wayne Truter, 1987/88–1996/97
 Cebo Tshiki, 2014/15–2019/20

V

 Wayne van As, 1991/92–1994/95
 Martyn van Blommenstein, 1981/82
 Casper van der Merwe, 1979/80–1982/83
 Mark van der Merwe, 1990/91–1992/93
 Janse van der Ryst, 1991/92
 Mark van Heerden, 2012/13–2013/14
 Johannes van Rensburg, 1988/89
 Essias van Rooyen, 1980/81–1988/89
 Wickus van Vuuren, 2004/05–2011/12
 Dewald van Wyk, 1998/99–1999/00
 Jacques van Wyk, 1998/99–2008/09
 Lenert van Wyk, 2002/03–2012/13
 Dan van Zyl, 1998/99
 Stiaan van Zyl, 2001/02–2016/17
 Ricardo Vasconcelos, 2016/17–2017/18
 Herman Venter, 1998/99
 Gilliam Vermeulen, 1985/86–1988/89
 Chris Viljoen, 1979/80–1981/82
 John Villet, 1994/95–1995/96
 Andre Volsteedt, 1994/95–1995/96
 Chrisjan Vorster, 1993/94–1996/97

W

 Jacques Wahl, 1991/92–1993/94
 Paul Wallace, 1979/80–1982/83
 Lee-Roy Walters, 2004/05–2011/12
 Benjamin Ward, 2019/20
 Andre Wasserfall, 1980/81
 Andrew Watts, 1985/86–1986/87
 Andrew Wessels, 1995/96–1996/97
 Stuart White, 1992/93–1993/94
 Timothy Whitehead, 2019/20
 Justin Wiggill, 1995/96–1997/98
 Louis Wilkinson, 2002/03
 Brandon Williams, 2009/10
 Elton Williams, 1996/97–1997/98
 Henry Williams, 1991/92–2003/04
 Lizaad Williams, 2008/09–2019/20
 Charl Willoughby, 1994/95–1999/00
 Craig Wilson, 1999/00
 Sarel Wolmarans, 1998/99–1999/00
 Andrew Wylie, 1992/93–1997/98

Notes

References

Cricket in South Africa
Boland